Jonathan Deans is an American sound designer. His work spans from Covent Garden, the Royal Opera House to The Beatles 'LOVE' and Michael Jackson's 'ONE' in Las Vegas.

Deans has been nominated for Tony and Drama Desk Awards. He is also been presented with a USITT award for his distinguished career in music.

See also 

 Tony Award for Best Sound Design

References 

Living people
Year of birth missing (living people)